The People's Savings Bank also known as Celje Bank is a bank in the town of Celje in Slovenia. It was founded in 1895 by the Catholic middle class. It has branches in Celje and Ljubljana. Its building was designed by Slovene architect Jože Plečnik and was built between 1928 and 1929.

Banks of Slovenia
Companies based in Celje
Banks established in 1895
Jože Plečnik buildings
Commercial buildings completed in 1929
Art Nouveau architecture in Slovenia
Art Nouveau commercial buildings
1895 establishments in Austria-Hungary
20th-century architecture in Slovenia